Somers Lake is a lake located on Vancouver Island south west of the junction of Stamp River and Ash River.

See also
List of lakes of British Columbia

References

Alberni Valley
Lakes of Vancouver Island
Alberni Land District